Filip Zubčić (born 27 January 1993) is a Croatian World Cup alpine ski racer and specializes in giant slalom. Born in Zagreb, he has competed for Croatia in three Winter Olympics and six World Championships. Zubčić was third in the giant slalom season standings in 2020 and season standings in 2021, and fifth overall.

World Cup results

Season standings

Podiums
 3 wins – (3 GS)
 10 podiums – (9 GS, 1 SL); 28 top tens

Results per discipline

World Championship results

Olympic results

References

External links

Living people
Olympic alpine skiers of Croatia
Alpine skiers at the 2014 Winter Olympics
Alpine skiers at the 2018 Winter Olympics
Alpine skiers at the 2022 Winter Olympics
Croatian male alpine skiers
1993 births
Sportspeople from Zagreb